Bihari Mauritians are the descendants of mainly Bhojpuri and some Awadhi speaking migrants to Mauritius. A majority of Indo-Mauritians are of Bihari descent, and the majority of Mauritians are Indo-Mauritian (the Hindus:  Bhumihar, Vaishya, Brahmin, Rajput, Koeri, Chamar, Yadav, Kurmi, Banias, and Kayastha castes are well represented). All but one Mauritian prime ministers have been of Bihari descent.
The community includes a Hindu majority, followed by Muslims (Sunni Islam) while a minority practices Christianity. About 60 percent of the 1.2 million population of Mauritius is of Indian origin, many them from Bihar, with Bhojpuri as their mother tongue.

Bihari Mauritians were mainly from the Gaya, Chhapra, Bhojpur and Gopalganj and East and West Champaran districts. In those early days of Migration, the labourers referred Mauritius as 'Marich'.

Amitav Ghosh wrote an acclaimed novel set in this period, based on extensive research, called the 'Sea of Poppies'. This fictional account tells of a ship, called 'The Ibis', which brought the Bihari bonded labourers to Mauritius. The main characters who embark on the ship include a widow saved from enforced Sati by a man of lower caste, the daughter of a famous French botanist and a former aristocrat sentenced to penal transportation after going bankrupt. It also describes the devastation of the farming community in the region by the monopolistic British East India Company. According to the book, many small land owners were forced to cultivate poppies to produce the opium that was trafficked to China. This created a supply of hungry and impoverished Bihari migrants who were desperate enough to brave the hellish journey to Mauritius and even more distant colonies of the empire.

Social stratification
Though the island is divided on ethnic and religious grounds, 'Hindu' Mauritians follow a number of original custom and tradition, quite different from those seen in the Indian subcontinent. Some castes in 'Mauritius' in particular are quite unrecognizable from a subcontinental perspective, and may incorporate mutually antagonistic castes from Indian setting into a single group. The title "Rajput" is used primarily by Shudra castes in Mauritius, which was usurped by this group in nineteenth century. The 'vaish' are the largest and most influential caste group on the island, in which Koeris, Kurmi, Yadav, Teli, Bania etc. are included. The former Brahmin elites together with former Rajputs and other Kshatriyas are called 'Babuji' and enjoy prestige conferred by high caste status , though politically they are marginalized and their place has been taken by the  castes who identify themselves as 'vaish'.

References

Mauritian

Indian diaspora in Mauritius